Zaynab bint Ali, was the eldest daughter of Ali, the fourth Rashidun caliph and the first Shia Imam, and Fatima, the daughter of the Islamic prophet Muhammad. Zaynab is best known for her role in the aftermath of the Battle of Karbala (680), in which her brother Husayn and his family and companions were massacred by the forces of Yazid I. The women and children were taken captive after the battle and marched to Kufa and then Damascus, where Zaynab gave impassioned speeches, condemning Yazid and spreading the news of Karbala. She was later freed and died shortly afterward in 682, though her burial site is uncertain.

The two shrines associated with Zaynab in Damascus and Cairo are destinations for Muslim pilgrimage. She is considered to be a figure of sacrifice, strength, and piety in Islam, and a role model for Muslim women, typifying courage, leadership, and defiance against oppression.

Titles 
The name 'Zaynab' can be translated as 'adornment of father'. She is also known as Zaynab al-Kubra to distinguish her from her younger sister Umm Kulthum or Zaynab al-Sughra. Another title of Zaynab is Aqilatu Bani Hashim, where  literally means 'the secluded one' or 'pearl'. She is also recognized as Batalatu al-Karbala for her role in that event. She is also known simply as al-Sayyida, and in Egypt as al-Tahira and Umm al-Yat'am'a, among others.

Birth and early life
Zaynab was the third child of Ali and Fatima, and their eldest daughter, though there is no clarity about the other details of her early life. In particular, the year of her birth is given variously by different sources as 4-6/626-8 or 9/631. Shia Muslims celebrate her birthday annually on 5 Jumada al-Awwal. 

The name 'Zaynab' was chosen by her grandfather Muhammad, who attributed the name to divine inspiration. When she was born, Gabriel is said to have forewarned Muhammad about her difficult life. The prophet was very fond of his granddaughter, saying that she resembled his wife Khadija. Shia sources also emphasize the intense devotion of the young Zaynab to her brother Husayn. Unlike her parents and her two brothers, namely, Hasan and Husayn, Zaynab is not among the Fourteen Infallibles in Twelver Shia. As she was raised with and by infallibles, she is nevertheless believed to have had "minor infallibility" in Twelver Shia. 

As a young child, she might have foreseen her future trials: The young Zaynab is said to have seen in a dream that she was caught in a large tree amidst a storm. When the tree was uprooted by the strong winds, she grasped for branches and twigs, which also broke one after another, and she woke us as she began to fall. Muhammad told her that the tree, the branches, and the twigs represented her grandfather, parents, and brothers, respectively, who would all die before her.

Death of Muhammad and Fatima (11/632) 
Muhammad died in 11/632 and Zaynab thus lost her grandfather at an early age. As his family prepared for the burial, a group of Muslims gathered at the Saqifa and appointed Abu Bakr as Muhammad's successor in the absence of his family and the majority of the Muhajirun (Meccan Muslims). Ali, Fatima, and some supporters did not recognize the caliphate of Abu Bakr, saying that Muhammad had appointed Ali as his successor at the Ghadir Khumm shortly before his death.

Soon after the Saqifa affair, Umar is known to have led an armed mob to Ali's residence and threatened to set the house on fire if Ali and his supporters did not pledge their allegiance to Abu Bakr. The confrontation then grew violent, but the mob retreated without securing Ali's pledge. 

Fatima died in the same year, within six months of Muhammad's death, and at the age of about eighteen or twenty-seven years old. Shia Islam alleges that she miscarried her child and died from the injuries she suffered in an attack on her house to subdue Ali, instigated by Abu Bakr and led by his aide Umar. These allegations are rejected by Sunnis, who believe that Fatima died from grief after Muhammad's death and that her child died in infancy of natural causes.

Zaynab thus lost her mother at the age of about five. The Sunni Abd al-Rahman writes that Fatima on her deathbed entrusted Zaynab with a white garment for Husayn to wear as his shroud when leaving for the battlefield in Karbala.

Marriage and family life 
Zaynab married her paternal cousin Abd Allah, whose father Ja'far al-Tayyar ibn Abi Talib was Muhammad's cousin and a prominent early Muslim who fell in the Battle of Mu'ta (629) against the Byzantines.

Abd Allah was a narrator of prophetic hadiths, thirteen of which appear in the canonical Sunni collection Musnad Ibn Hanbal. He also narrated hadiths from Shia Imams and might have lived long enough to be a companion to the Shia Imam Muhammad al-Baqir, though this is not reported by the Shia Shaykh Tusi. Abd Allah was wealthy and known for his generosity, though he is said to have lived modestly, and their marriage ceremony is described as a simple affair. The Shia Eshtehardi writes that Zaynab married Abd Allah on the condition that she would be allowed to visit Husayn daily and travel with him.

The couple had four sons, named Ali, Awn, Abbas, and Muhammad, and a daughter named Umm Kulthum. Esposito differs here, saying that the couple had three sons and two daughters, without naming them. Awn and Muhammad were killed in the Battle of Karbala. There is no information about Abbas at hand but Zaynab's lineage continued through Ali, also known as Ali al-Zaynabi.

Religious learning and eloquence 
For her knowledge of prophetic hadiths, Ibn Abbas referred to Zaynab as Aqilatu Bani Hashim. According to Hamdar, her reputation among the hadith scholars was such that they cited Ali as the 'father of Zaynab' during the Umayyad's ban on speaking about Ali. She also taught Quranic exegesis to women in Medina and later in Kufa, and was likely trained in this by her father Ali, whom Qutbuddin considers "the most learned of [Islamic] sages."

Zaynab is described as eloquent, reputedly reminding the listeners of his father Ali. A sermon attributed to Zaynab after the Battle of Karbala is recorded by Ibn Abi Tahir Tayfur in his Balaghat al-nisa', an anthology of eloquent speeches by women. The book also contains another sermon, attributed to Zaynab's sister Umm Kulthum, which has been nevertheless ascribed to Zaynab by most later authors, including Ibn A'tham. Qutbuddin considers this latter attribution a strong possibility.

Death of Ali (661) 
Ali was elected caliph in 656 and established himself in Kufa as his de facto capital in 656-7. Zaynab and Abd Allah accompanied him to Kufa. Ali was later assassinated during the morning prayers at the Mosque of Kufa in January 661, during the month of Ramadan. The Shia Al-irshad details that Ali spent his last night as Zaynab's guest for Iftar and Suhur, and that the wounded Ali was brought back to her house after the attack. Ali's eldest son Hasan was soon elected caliph after Ali but abdicated in favor of Mu'awiya in August 661, facing the latter's overwhelming military superiority and the weak support of the Iraqis for war. The peace treaty with Mu'awiya stipulated that he should not appoint a successor.

Death of Hasan (669) 
Hasan returned to Medina after abdication, accompanied by the family, where he kept aloof from politics in compliance with the peace treaty with Mu'awiya. Early sources are nearly unanimous that Hasan was later poisoned at the instigation of Mu'awiya in 669, possibly to pave the way for the succession of his son Yazid. Zaynab is said to have attended her brother Hasan in his final days. Hasan was thus succeeded as the head of Muhammad's family by his brother Husayn, who upheld the treaty with Mu'awiya.

Accession of Yazid (680) 
Mu'awiya designated his son Yazid as his successor in 676, violating his earlier agreement with Ali's eldest son Hasan. Yazid is often remembered by Muslim historians as a debaucher who openly violated the Islamic norms, and his nomination was met with resistance from the sons of Muhammad's prominent companions, including Husayn ibn Ali.

On Mu'awiya's death and Yazid's succession in 60/680, the latter instructed the governor of Medina to secure Husayn's pledge of allegiance by force, and Husayn thus fled to Mecca at night to avoid recognizing Yazid as the caliph. He was accompanied by some relatives, including Zaynab and two of his sons, namely, Awn and Muhammad.

Zaynab's husband Abd Allah did not accompany Husayn even though he was sympathetic to Husayn's cause, writes the Sunni al-Tabari. The Shia Eshtehardi suggests that Abd Allah's absence must have been due to his poor health or old age and that sending his sons to fight for Husayn was an indication of his support. In contrast, the Sunni Abd al-Rahman writes that Zaynab must have divorced Abd Allah before leaving and that he later married Zaynab's sister Umm Kulthum, though her views have been criticized by some. As the husband's permission is normally necessary in such cases, some have suggested that a condition of her marriage to Abd Allah was that Zaynab could accompany Husayn in all his travels or specifically to Karbala.

Battle of Karbala (680)

Journey towards Karbala 
After receiving letters of support from Kufans, whose intentions were confirmed by his cousin Muslim ibn Aqil, Husayn left Mecca for Kufa on 8 or 10 Dhu al-Hijja (10 or 12 September 680) with some relatives and supporters. In the canonical Shia al-Irshad, Husayn is reported to have said that his intention was to fight the tyranny of Yazid, even though he knew he was going to be killed. He similarly wrote in his will for his brother Ibn Hanafiyya that he had not set out to seek "corruption or oppression" but rather to "enjoin what is right and forbid what is wrong," as reported by Maqtal al-awalim and al-Maqtal. On his way to Kufa, Husayn's small caravan was intercepted by Yazid's army and forced to camp in the desert land of Karbala on 2 Muharram 61 (2 October 680) away from water and fortifications. The promised support of the Kufans did not materialize as the new governor of Kufa, Ubayd Allah ibn Ziyad, killed Husayn's envoy and intimidated the Kufan tribal chiefs.

Water shortage 
On 7 Muharram, acting on orders of Ibn Ziyad, the Umayyad commander Umar ibn Sa'd cut off Husayn's access to the nearby Euphrates. Husayn's (half) brother Abbas and some fifty companions were nevertheless able to bring back some water to Husayn's camp in a night sortie. Despite this attempt, Veccia Vaglieri believes that Husayn's camp suffered from thirst for three days, while Adibzadeh notes the hot desert climate of Karbala. Pinault similarly writes that the camp suffered from hunger and thirst during the siege, and the opinion of Hamdar is close.

Negotiations 
Ibn Sa'd was instructed by Ibn Ziyad not to let Husayn leave unless he pledged his allegiance to Yazid. Husayn did not submit to Yazid, but negotiated with Ibn Ziyad through Ibn Sa'd to be allowed to retreat and avoid bloodshed, but the governor did not relent, finally ordering Ibn Sa'd to fight, kill, and disfigure Husayn and his supporters unless they pledged allegiance to Yazid, in which case Ibn Ziyad would later decide whether to punish or forgive them.

Tasu'a 
Having received his final orders from Ibn Ziyad, Ibn Sa'd prepared to attack in the afternoon of Tasu'a (9 Muharram). As the Umayyad's army approached, Husayn sent his brother Abbas and some companions to Ibn Sa'd, convincing the Umayyad commander to delay the confrontation until the following day. Husayn then besieged his followers in a speech to leave under the cloak of night and not risk their lives for his sake, after which nearly all of his followers renewed their pledges of support. Husayn also revived and consoled Zaynab who had fainted in despair from the news, writes Veccia Vaglieri.

Husayn and his companions spent the night praying and reading the Quran, reports the Shia Ibn Tawus and most  works. On this night, Zaynab is said to have reminded her brother Abbas of their father's wish for the latter to be the reserves of Karbala, and to be to Husayn as Ali was to Muhammad. This Abbas confirmed and swore to do.

Ashura 

On the morning of Ashura (10 Muharram), Husayn organized his supporters, some seventy-two men, and then spoke to the enemy lines and asked them why they considered it lawful to kill Muhammad's grandson. The Umayyad commander al-Hurr ibn Yazid al-Tamimi defected to Husayn's side after this speech. The Umayyad army then showered the camp with arrows, thus commencing the battle which lasted from morning till sunset and consisted of incidents of single combat, skirmishes, assaults, and retreats. The Umayyad army also set Husayn's tents on fire, though al-Tabari writes that the tent of Husayn's wives (and children) was spared, adding that Shamir ibn Dhi al-Jawshan was dissuaded by others from setting that tent aflame.  

The companions all perished by the early afternoon and were followed by the Banu Hashim, including two sons of Husayn, three sons of Hasan, and the two sons of Zaynab present at Karbala, whom she is said to have encouraged to fight. For the Shia, Zaynab's motive in sacrificing her children was the survival of (Shia) Islam, even more so than her love for Husayn. A well-known account by the Shia Ibn Tawus and others states that Husayn's standard-bearer Abbas was killed during a desperate attempt on the evening of Ashura to bring water from the Euphrates to quench the unbearable thirst of the besieged family of Muhammad.

Zaynab consoled the families of the fallen warriors throughout the day, cared for the wounded, and witnessed the battle from a platform made of saddles, though she is said to have remained in her tent when it was the turn of her sons to fight. There is a report that she rushed to the battlefield to help at some point on Ashura but was called back by Husayn who instructed her to care for the women, the children, and the wounded. Al-Tabari similarly writes that Zaynab ran to the scene and threw herself on her nephew Ali al-Akbar ibn Husayn crying when the latter was killed in the fight. Husayn walked her back to the camp.

Death of Husayn 

As Husayn's last remaining warrior thus fell, the Umayyad army converged on the lone Imam, who fought until the end. Before he left for the battlefield one last time, Zaynab kissed him on behalf of their mother Fatima to fulfill her wish, writes the Shia Eshtehardi on the authority of Zaynab. According to al-Tabari, Husayn in turn asked Zaynab not to lament after his imminent death. When the wounded Husayn finally fell from his horse and was surrounded, Zaynab is said to have run towards him, beseeching Ibn Sa'd to spare his brother's life, but the Umayyad commander ignored her request.

Al-Tabari writes that Husayn's family witnessed as he was repeatedly stabbed and slashed by the Umayyad soldiers. Husayn was then decapitated by Shamir or Sinan ibn Anas or Khawali ibn Yazid Asbahi, though the common narratives of the battle hold Shamir responsible for this. Some sources add that Zaynab had returned to the camp, urged by the dying Husayn, and did not witness the beheading of his brother, though al-Tabari differs here. The modern narratives about Karbala often emphasize that Zaynab did not break down as she witnessed the murder of his brother, following Husayn's earlier wishes. Standing over Husayn's body, she reputedly uttered, "O God! Accept from us this offering," to the bewilderment of the enemy soldiers.

Immediate aftermath 
After the death of Husayn, the Umayyad soldiers stole his garments and personal belongings, pillaged the camp, and severed the heads of his killed companions, which they then raised on spears for display. There are also reports of children's death during the stampede. Acting upon earlier orders of Ibn Ziyad, the body of Husayn was trampled by ten horsemen who volunteered to "inflict this final indignity" upon him. Some seventy-two bodies of Husayn and his companions were later buried by the Banu Asad men of the nearby al-Ghadiriyya village.   

The women and children were taken captive, including Zaynab and Umm Kulthum. Among the captives was also Husayn's only surviving son Ali, who had been too ill to fight. Often known by the honorific titles al-Sajjad and Zayn al-Abidin, Ali ibn al-Husayn was later recognized as the fourth of the Twelve Imams and it was through him that the line of Shia Imams continued. Shamir attempted to kill Ali too, but Zaynab successfully pleaded to him to spare his life, saying that she had to be killed first. The captives mourned Husayn shortly after the battle.

Captives in Kufa 
The captives were marched back to Kufa, arriving there on 12 Muharram, and there are reports that the women were dishonored and ogled, and the captives were humiliated, carried on unsaddled camels and, according to al-Tabari, bound in ropes and shackles. The captives were then paraded in shackles and unveiled around the city alongside the heads of Husayn and his companions on spears. Deeb believes that the captives regarded Zaynab as their leader.

Zaynab's speech in Kufa 
The Sunni Ibn Tayfur records two speeches about Karbala in his Balaghat al-nisa''', one attributed to Umm Kulthum in the market of Kufa and the other given by Zaynab at the court of Yazid in Damascus. Most later Shia authors, however, have attributed both sermons to Zaynab, which Qutbuddin considers highly likely. Ibn Tayfur writes that the Kufans wailed and wept when they saw the prophet's family in captivity. Zaynab then addressed the crowd and chastised them for their role in Husayn's death and recounted the events of Karbala.        

 Court of Ibn Ziyad 
As reported by the Sunni al-Tabari and the Shia Shaykh al-Mufid, the captives were then brought to Ibn Ziyad, who boasted to Zaynab about killing Husayn and his family. She countered with the Verse of Purification (33:33) and the elevated status of Muhammad's family in the Quran, adding that murder was ordained for Husayn and his supporters, and that God will soon judge between them and Ibn Ziyad. Her response angered the governor who nevertheless restrained himself after his men told him that a woman could not be blamed for what she said. Ibn Ziyad also ordered the lone male survivor of the battle to be executed but was dissuaded when Zaynab protected his nephew Ali ibn Husayn and asked to be killed before him, as reported by Abu Mikhnaf, Ibn Sa'd, and al-Tabari. After releasing the non-Hashemite captives, Ibn Ziyad imprisoned the rest for a while and then sent them to Damascus.

 Journey to Damascus 
The caravan's route to Damascus is uncertain, though Pinault believes that they were taken through the desert path. Al-Khawrazmi (tenth century) in his al-Maqtal writes that the captives were taken from "village to village" and displayed, while al-Ya'qubi reports that Ibn Abbas reprimanded Yazid in a letter for parading the women of Muhammad's family from Kufa to Damascus to show his victory, adding that this was worse in his view than the massacre of Husayn and his family. 

 Captives in Damascus 

The captives were paraded in the streets of Damascus and then imprisoned for an unspecified period of time. When brought to the caliph, Veccia Vaglieri writes that Yazid treated the captives kindly after an initial harsh interview. Similar accounts have been offered by Madelung and Halm. In contrast, Momen writes that Yazid insulted the captives but was forced to release them later as the public opinion began to sway in their favor, fearing unrest in his territory. Similar views are expressed in the works of Esposito, Osman, Aghaie, Pinault, Tabatabai, and Munson.   

According to the Shia Tabarsi and the Sunni Abu Mikhnaf, the captives were brought in a ceremony to the caliph, who recited poetry and gloated about avenging his pagan family members killed at the Battle of Badr (624) over the severed head of Husayn. By some accounts, Yazid also dishonored the severed head with blows from a cane, though other reports attribute this episode to Ibn Ziyad, including the account of Veccia Vaglieri in which a respectful Yazid blames and curses his governor for killing Husayn. Recounting this account, Madelung adds that the early (Sunni) sources tend to exonerate the caliph at the cost of Ibn Ziyad, and argues that the prime responsibility for killing Husayn rests with Yazid.  

 Zaynab's speech in Damascus 

Ibn Tayfur in his Balaghat al-nisa''' attributes to Zaynab a speech in the court of Yazid, where she is said to have interrupted Yazid's insults and addressed his court harshly, lamenting Husayn, castigating Yazid, and defending the family of Muhammad. She addressed the caliph as "the son of " (those who were pardoned by Muhammad upon his victorious return to Mecca), and asked him if it was just to keep his women guarded and parade the daughters of Muhammad in the streets. 

As with the Kufa speech, this second sermon attributed to Zaynab is infused with several Quranic references, as she called Yazid's victory temporary, his efforts futile, and his shame eternal, quoting verse 3:179, "Let not disbelievers think that our respite is a good thing. Indeed, we give them respite so that they may increase in trespass, and a shameful punishment awaits them," and verse 11:18, "The curse of God be upon the oppressor," among others.

Other episodes 
There are reports by the Sunni al-Tabari and the Shia Ibn Babawayh that a Syrian at one point asked the caliph to give her a daughter of Husayn as a slave but Zaynab challenged and dissuaded Yazid from granting permission. The Shia jurisprudent Mughniyya writes that Zaynab in Damascus was asked sarcastically how she perceived the events of Karbala, to which she replied, "I have not seen anything except that it was beautiful". This response in that hostile environment, contends Mughniyya, highlights Zaynab's political strength and vision. A young child of Husayn is said to have died in Damascus, often identified as Sakina or Ruqayye. The  narrative emphasizes her suffering and death in captivity. In Damascus, the captives continued to mourn Husayn, possibly joined by some women from Yazid's court.

Return to Medina 

The captives were eventually freed and allowed to return to Medina or escorted back. Pinault and Adibzadeh write that the caravan returned by way of Karbala, where they halted to mourn their dead. In the  narrative, the family of Muhammad was assisted by a man named Bashir, who was generously compensated by Zaynab and others from the little that was left after the looting on Ashura.

The Shia view is that Zaynab's words must have swayed some in Yazid's court, especially his women, and thus compelled the caliph to disassociate himself from the events in Karbala and blame his governor for them. Similar views have been voiced by some contemporary authors.

Death (682) and shrines 

Zaynab died in 682 at the age of about fifty-six, not long after returning to Medina from Damascus. Adamec gives the year 681 instead. The Shia annually commemorate the most frequently cited date of 15 Rajab for this occasion, though other dates found in the sources are 11 and 21 of Jumadi al-Thani, 24 Safar, and 16 Dhu al-Hijja.

Little is known about Zaynab's life after returning to Medina, though the silence of al-Tabari about it suggests that she was not involved with the uprising of Abd-Allah ibn al-Zubayr. Some reports state that she died in Medina, others say that she travelled with her husband to his Syrian estates, where she died, and yet other sources write that she was exiled, possibly to Egypt, for publicizing the events of Karbala. As such, her burial place is uncertain, with claims made both for Sayyida Zaynab Mosque in the suburbs of Damascus and another mosque at the heart of Cairo with the same name. While the Sunni al-Tabari placed her grave in Cairo and the Shia Muhsin al-Amin considered Damascus unlikely, the key evidence offered in favor of Cairo is the existence of the shrine itself, which officially dates back to the third century AH, supplemented by the testimonies of travellers and notables who lived at least two centuries after Zaynab. The shrines in Damascus and Cairo are both destinations for Muslim pilgrimage, the former often visited by the Shia and the latter often by the Sunni.

Ritual mourning
Following the precedents of Zaynab and Shia Imams in mourning Husayn, Shia Muslims commemorate the Karbala events throughout the months of Muharram and Safar, particularly during the first ten days of Muharram, culminating on Ashura with processions in major Shia cities. The main component of these ritual ceremonies (sing. ) is the narration of the stories of Karbala, intended to raise sympathy and move the audience to tears. It is in these ceremonies that Zaynab and other women of Karbala are also commemorated.

Historical impact

Role model 
Qutbuddin identifies Zaynab as a role model for Muslim women and a symbol of "courage, fortitude, leadership, eloquence, devotion, and faith." This view is common, and her steadfast stance against tyranny and oppression has been widely emulated by Muslim female activists, particularly in the recent histories of Iran and Lebanon. Zaynab's birthday is recognized as Nurses Day in Iran, possibly because she cared for the wounded in Karbala.

Messenger of Karbala 
The Karbala event is the single most important episode in the history of Shia. The Shia view it is as the ultimate struggle between justice and truth against oppression and falsehood, in which Husayn offered all that was dear to him in the righteous struggle in God's cause. Zaynab is described as Husayn's partner in his , whose activism transformed Karbala from a tragedy to a victory, writes Osman. Without her " of words," the events of Karbala would have been forgotten, contends Hamdar.

Gallery

See also

References

Sources

External links

 Zaynab's speech at the court of Yazid

Battle of Karbala
Children of Ali
Children of Rashidun caliphs
Women companions of the Prophet
626 births
Year of birth uncertain
682 deaths
7th-century Arabs